The Chunta Aragonesista (CHA) is a political party in Aragon (Spain), influenced by eco-socialism and pacifism. CHA defends a federal state, greater financial resources for Aragon, and the protection of the environment and hydrological resources of the Ebro Valley.  It promotes the use of the Aragonese language.

Organization
The National Assembly is the highest organ of representation and decision of the Chunta. It establishes political policies, programs and principles, and chooses the members of the Mayan of Lawsuits, to those of the National Committee and to the president of CHA.

History
In the 2000 and 2004 parliamentary elections, CHA won 0.4% of the vote and 1 seat for José Antonio Labordeta, a folk singer in the Zaragoza constituency. It lost the seat in 2008 after Labordeta retired from the congress. In the 2011 election it regained the seat as part of an electoral alliance with United Left.

Chunta Aragonesista was a member of the European Free Alliance and the European coalition, Europe of the Peoples until 2018.

José Luis Soro has been the president since February 2012.

In 2005, the party campaigned against the ratification of the European Constitution.

Electoral performance

Cortes of Aragon

Symbols

References

External links
 CHA's official website

Pacifism in Spain
Political parties in Aragon
Political parties established in 1986
European Free Alliance
Regionalist parties in Spain
1986 establishments in Spain
Socialist parties in Spain
Aragonese nationalism